The Federal Senate is the upper house of the National Congress of Brazil. When created under the Imperial Constitution in 1824, it was based on the House of Lords of the British Parliament, but since the Proclamation of the Republic in 1889 and under the first republican Constitution the Federal Senate has resembled the United States Senate.

The current president of the Federal Senate is Rodrigo Pacheco, a member of the Social Democratic Party from Minas Gerais. He was elected in February 2021 for a two-year term and re-elected in February 2023 for another two-year term.

Membership

The Senate has 81 members, serving an eight-year term of office. There are three senators from each of the country's 27 federative units, the Federal District and the 26 states. Elections are staggered so that either a third or two-thirds of senators are up for election every four years. The most recent election took place in 2022, where one-third of the Senate was elected.

Electoral system

Elections are held under the first-past-the-post and block voting systems. In years when a third of members are up for election, voters can cast only one vote and the candidate who receives a plurality of votes within their state is elected. In years when two-thirds of members are up for election, voters can cast two votes. People can not vote for the same candidate twice, but each party can field up to two candidates in each state. The two highest-placed candidates in each state are elected.

History
The Federal Senate of Brazil was established as the Imperial Senate by the Constitution of 1824, first enacted after the Declaration of Independence. It was modelled on the House of Lords of the British Parliament.

Following independence, in 1822, Emperor Pedro I ordered the convocation of a Assembleia Geral Constituinte e Legislativa (Legislative and Constituent General Assembly) to draft the country's first Constitution. Following several disagreements with the elected deputies (which included representatives from present-day Uruguay, then part of the Brazilian Empire under the name of Província Cisplatina), the Emperor dissolved the Assembly. In 1824, Pedro I implemented the first Constitution which established a legislative branch with the Chamber of Deputies as the lower house, and the Senate as an upper house.

The first configuration of the Senate was a consulting body to the Emperor. Membership was for life and it was a place of great prestige, to which only a small part of the population could aspire. The original Senate had 50 members, representing all of the Empire's provinces, each with a number of senators proportional to its population. In addition to these elected senators, daughters and sons of the Emperor aged at least 25 were senators by right.

The elected members of the Senate had to be at least 40 years old and have an annual income of 800,000 contos-de-réis, which limited candidates to wealthy citizens. Voters also faced an income qualification. Voting in an election for the Senate was limited to male citizens with an annual income of at least 200,000 contos-de-réis. Those who qualified for this did not vote directly for senators; instead, they voted for candidates to be Senate electors. To be a Senate elector required an annual income of 400,000 contos-de-réis. Once elected, these electors would then vote for senator. The election itself would not result in a winner automatically. The three candidates receiving the most votes would make up what was called a "triple list", from which the Emperor would select one individual that would be considered "elected". The Emperor usually chose the candidate with the most votes, but it was within his discretion to select whichever of the three individuals listed.

Following the adoption of the 1824 Constitution, the first session of the Senate took place in May 1826. The Emperor had repeatedly delayed calling the first election, which had led to accusations that he would attempt to establish an absolutist government.

The Proclamation of the Republic in 1889 ended the Brazilian Empire in favor of the First Republic. The 1891 Constitution was then adopted, transforming Brazil's provinces into states and the Senate into an elected body. This was retained under later constitutions, including the current 1988 Constitution. Now known as the Federal Senate, it resembles the United States Senate in that each state has the same number of senators.

Presiding Board 
The current composition of the Mesa Diretora (Presiding Board) of the Federal Senate is as follows:

Composition 
The current composition of the Senate (57th Legislature) is as follows:

Current senators 

Acre
  Alan Rick (UNIÃO)
  Márcio Bittar (UNIÃO)
  Sérgio Petecão (PSD)

Alagoas
  Fernando Farias (MDB)
  Renan Calheiros (MDB)
  Rodrigo Cunha (UNIÃO)

Amapá
  Davi Alcolumbre (UNIÃO)
  Lucas Barreto (PSD)
  Randolfe Rodrigues (REDE)

Amazonas
  Eduardo Braga (MDB)
  Omar Aziz (PSD)
  Plínio Valério (PSDB)

Bahia
  Angelo Coronel (PSD)
  Jaques Wagner (PT)
  Otto Alencar (PSD)

Ceará
  Augusta Brito (PT)
  Cid Gomes (PDT)
  Eduardo Girão (NOVO)

Espírito Santo
  Fabiano Contarato (PT)
  Magno Malta (PL)
  Marcos do Val (PODE)

Federal District
  Damares Alves (Republicanos)
  Izalci Lucas (PSDB)
  Leila Barros (PDT)

Goiás
  Jorge Kajuru (PSB)
  Vanderlan Cardoso (PSD)
  Wilder Morais (PL)

Maranhão
  Ana Paula Lobato (PSB)
  Eliziane Gama (PSD)
  Weverton Rocha (PDT)

Mato Grosso
  Jayme Campos (UNIÃO)
  Margareth Buzetti (PSD)
  Wellington Fagundes (PL)

Mato Grosso do Sul
  Nelson Trad (PSD)
  Soraya Thronicke (UNIÃO)
  Tereza Cristina (PP)

Minas Gerais
  Carlos Viana (PODE)
  Cleiton Gontijo (Republicanos)
  Rodrigo Pacheco (PSD)

Pará
  Beto Faro (PT)
  Jader Barbalho (MDB)
  Zequinha Marinho (PL)

Paraíba
  Daniella Ribeiro (PSD)
  Efraim Filho (UNIÃO)
  Veneziano Vital (MDB)

Paraná
  Flávio Arns (PSB)
  Oriovisto Guimarães (PODE)
  Sérgio Moro (UNIÃO)

Pernambuco
  Humberto Costa (PT)
  Jarbas Vasconcelos (MDB)
  Teresa Leitão (PT)

Piauí
  Ciro Nogueira (PP)
  Jussara Lima (PSD)
  Marcelo Castro (MDB)

Rio de Janeiro
  Carlos Portinho (PL)
  Flávio Bolsonaro (PL)
  Romário Faria (PL)

Rio Grande do Norte
  Rogério Marinho (PL)
  Styvenson Valentim (PODE)
  Zenaide Maia (PSD)

Rio Grande do Sul
  Hamilton Mourão (Republicanos)
  Luis Carlos Heinze (PP)
  Paulo Paim (PT)

Rondônia
  Confúcio Moura (MDB)
  Jaime Bagattoli (PL)
  Marcos Rogério (PL)

Roraima
  Chico Rodrigues (PSB)
  Hiran Gonçalves (PP)
  Mecias de Jesus (Republicanos)

Santa Catarina
  Espiridião Amin (PP)
  Ivete da Silveira (MDB)
  Jorge Seif (PL)

São Paulo
  Alexandre Giordano (MDB)
  Mara Gabrilli (PSD)
  Marcos Pontes (PL)

Sergipe
  Alessandro Vieira (PSDB)
  Laercio Oliveira (PP)
  Rogério Carvalho (PT)

Tocantins
  Dorinha Rezende (UNIÃO)
  Eduardo Gomes (PL)
  Irajá Abreu (PSD)

Standing committees

See also 
Federal institutions of Brazil

Notes

References

External links
Official website of the Brazilian Senate (archived 15 June 2014)
 Photos 360° of the Brazilian Senate
List of all Brazilian senators (1826–2011) 

Brazil
1824 establishments in Brazil